Sanjauli is a major populous locality of the city of Shimla, in the Shimla district of Himachal Pradesh, India.

Geography 
As the main suburb of the city, the area comprises Cemetery Road, HB Colony, Chalaunthi, Bhatta Kuffar, Sanjay Van, Dhingu Dhar, Shanan, Navbhar, and areas on the other side of the Sanjauli-Dhali tunnel built at the time when Shimla was the summer capital of British India. An area of unique architecture, there is a wide and long market area from Sanjauli Chowk to the tunnel. Sanjauli is situated below the Jakhu Hill and since 2008 there has been a bypass to Dhalli, which diverts from the main road near Government College and passes through Chalaunthi. Sanjauli is situated at a distance of 8 kilometers from the main Shimla town, but it also accessible by another path which comes through the Lakkar Bazaar bus stand. Additionally, it is reachable on foot from Mall Road through Indira Gandhi Medical College & Hospital, which takes 35–40 minutes on a leisurely walk. It is one of the highly populated areas of Shimla, since it extends over a large distance. Much like other hill towns, it is also situated atop a slope of a hill, which extends right from the temple at the top to the Dhalli bypass road at the bottom.

Education 
Sanjauli is home to the Government College Sanjauli, earlier Government College Simla. This was the first degree college set up in Shimla in 1969 and the first to be conferred with the status of Centre Of Excellence in 2006. The college is affiliated with Himachal Pradesh University and stands close to the Indira Gandhi Medical College and Hospital. Navbhar is the location of the St.Bede's College and Convent of Jesus and Mary School There are also other Government schools, primary schools and play schools for little kids.

Healthcare 
Shimla is the area's healthcare centre, hosting a medical college and four major hospitals. In the town of Sanjauli, the only health care options are a Primary Health care center and private practitioners. The Indira Gandhi Medical College is around a 15-minute walk away and the other hospitals are also nearby. For residents of Sanjauli, health care is easily accessible and available due to the proximity with the city center of Shimla.

Nearby attractions 
 Dhingu Mata Temple, atop Dhingu Hill 
 Sanjauli Cemetery, the only cemetery in Shimla that is still in use. Presently it is used by Indian Christians, but was originally built by the British in 1921. 
 Buddhist monastery, near the Dhingu Mata Temple
 Gurudwara, at Sanjauli Chowk
 Lakshmi Narayan Temple: It is one of the old temples in the region. In the Sapahatik Temple, a Crystal Shivlinga is housed, the only one of its type in Himachal Pradesh.
 Navbahar: St. Bedes' College is located here. The area is surrounded by conifers all around and gives a calm environment.

Neighbourhoods in Shimla